North Carolina's 91st House district is one of 120 districts in the North Carolina House of Representatives. It has been represented by Republican Kyle Hall since 2015.

Geography
Since 2023, the district has included all of Stokes County, as well as part of Forsyth County. The district overlaps with the 31st Senate district.

District officeholders

Election results

2022

2020

2018

2016

2014

2012

2010

2008

2006

2004

2002

2000

References

North Carolina House districts
Stokes County, North Carolina
Forsyth County, North Carolina